Pavel Sudoplatov Battalion is a pro-Russian volunteer battalion in the Russian-occupied Zaporizhzhia Oblast of Ukraine named after the Soviet intelligence officer Pavel Sudoplatov. The battalion was established in September 2022 and consist of local population and foreign fighters. It is allied with the Russian-installed authorities in occupied Zaporizhzhia Oblast and it's head Yevgeny Balitsky whose son is a member of the battalion. As of January 2023, there are over 600 fighters in the battalion.

References 

2022 establishments in Ukraine
Battalions of Russia
Military units and formations established in 2022
Military units and formations of Russia